Ng Tsang Lau was a cape on the south west corner of Tsing Yi Island, Hong Kong. Its shore was reclaimed for the Mobil oil depot. It is near Tai Nam Wan on the island.

Tsing Yi
Capes of Hong Kong